Alexandre Edouard Baudrimont (7 May 1806 – 24 January 1880) was a 19th-century French professor of chemistry who published various books connected to the sciences, languages and the Basque Country (in particular Erromintxela):
 Dictionnaire de l'industrie manufacturière, commerciale et agricole (1837, Paris)
 Recherches anatomiques et physiologiques sur le développement du fœtus: et en particulier sur l'évolution embryonnaire des oiseaux et des batraciens (with Martin Saint-Ange, G.J.) (1846)
 Histoire des Basques ou Escualdunais primitifs, restaurée d'après la langue, les caractères ethnologiques et les mœurs des Basques actuels (1854, Paris)
 Vocabulaire de la langue des Bohémiens habitant les Pays Basque Français (1862, Bordeaux)

In the field of science he is best known for first preparation of Na3P in the mid-19th century by reacting molten sodium with phosphorus pentachloride.

Notes

Basque-language scholars
Romani language
19th-century French chemists
French Romani people
1806 births
1880 deaths